Andreassen is a common surname in Norway, meaning "son of Andreas". The parallel Danish forms are Andresen and Andreasen, the Swedish Andreasson. It may refer to:

 Anita Andreassen, Norwegian mushing competitor; she has also competed in cycling and cross country skiing
 Bjørn Andreassen (born 1946), Norwegian ice hockey player
 Elisabeth Andreassen (born 1958), known as "Bettan", a Norwegian singer
 Geir Hartly Andreassen, FSF, (born 1971), Norwegian cinematographer based in Stockholm, Sweden
 Gunn Margit Andreassen (born 1973), Norwegian biathlete
 Gunnar Andreassen (1913–2002), Norwegian football player and manager
 Harald Magnus Andreassen (born 1956), Norwegian economist
 Harriet Andreassen (1925–1997), Norwegian labour activist and politician for the Labour Party
 John Andreassen (born 1943), Norwegian TV-producer with the Norwegian Broadcasting Corporation
 Kjell Schou-Andreassen (1940–1997), Norwegian footballer and one of the country's most successful football managers
 Kristin Andreassen, American musician and dancer
 Marit Andreassen (born 1966), Norwegian actress, born in Svolvær
 Ole Petter Andreassen (born 1970), Norwegian musician and producer from Flekkefjord, Norway
 Rolf Andreassen (born 1949), Norwegian competition rower and Olympic medalist
 Tor Arne Andreassen (born 1983), Norwegian footballer who plays as a defender and midfielder
 Tormod Andreasen (born 1950), Norwegian curler

See also 
 Andreessen (disambiguation)
 Andriessen
 Andersen

References 

Norwegian-language surnames
Patronymic surnames